Alexander Obregón Gamboa (11 December 1977 – 30 May 2009) was a Colombian footballer who played the majority of his career in El Salvador.

Club career
Obregón arrived in El Salvador in 2001 and joined Salvadoran second division side Telecom. He joined San Salvador F.C. the next season, helping them win the 2003 Clausura title.

He later played for  Luis Ángel Firpo, Chalatenango and FAS, playing his final season of top division football with Independiente Nacional in 2007 after they were relegated. He played for the newly formed Santa Tecla team and finally joined former coach Rubén Alonso at Alba Acajutla.

Death
Obregón was involved in a fatal car crash in 2009, on the road to and just outside La Libertad. Former teammate and friend, Colombian player Christian Gil suffered severe injuries to the skull and thorax in the same accident.

Honours
Primera División de Fútbol de El Salvador: 1
 2003

References

External links
 Perece Alex Obregón -  El Diario de Hoy 
 Profile - CD FAS

1977 births
2009 deaths
Footballers from Cali
Association football forwards
Colombian footballers
América de Cali footballers
C.D. Chalatenango footballers
San Salvador F.C. footballers
C.D. FAS footballers
C.D. Luis Ángel Firpo footballers
Santa Tecla F.C. footballers
Colombian expatriate footballers
Expatriate footballers in El Salvador
Road incident deaths in El Salvador